The 2019 FIBA Basketball World Cup qualification for the FIBA Africa region, began in November 2017 and concluded in February 2019. The process determined the five African teams that would participate at the 2019 FIBA World Cup.

Entrants
The 16 teams that have qualified for AfroBasket 2017 earned a right to participate in the first round of the FIBA Basketball World Cup African qualifiers. Few days before the start of the campaign, South Africa withdrew from the qualification. They were replaced by Chad, runner-up from AfroBasket 2017 additional qualifying tournament. As of 10 November 2017, the qualified teams were:

Schedule
The schedule of the competition is expected to be as follows.

First round
All times are local.

Group A

Group B

Group C

Group D

Second round
In the second round, the top three teams from each group were placed in a group with three other top teams. All results from the first qualification round, were carried over to the second round. Games were played in September 2018, November 2018 and February 2019. The top two teams in each group along with the better placed third team qualified for the FIBA Basketball World Cup proper.

Group E

Group F

Best third placed team

References

External links
Official website

qualification
FIBA